Neacșu is a Romanian surname and sometimes a male given name.

Notable people with the surname include:

Ion Neacșu (1930–1988), Romanian footballer
Ionelia Neacșu (married name Ionelia Zaharia), Romanian rower, competed in the 2008 Summer Olympics
Lupu Neacșu, the author of Neacșu's letter
Maria Neacșu, Romanian footballer
Marilena Neacșu, Romanian artistic gymnast
Mihaela Neacșu, Romanian middle-distance runner, competed in the 2008 Summer Olympics
Nicolae Neacșu (1924–2002), Romani violinist
Robert Neacșu, Romanian footballer

As a male given name, it was used by:

Neacșu Șerbu (born 1928), Romanian boxer

Romanian-language surnames